John Adelbert Kelley (September 6, 1907 – October 6, 2004) was an American long-distance runner who twice represented his native country at the Summer Olympics, in 1936 and 1948, and competed in the Boston Marathon over 50 times, winning in 1935 and 1945. He was often dubbed "Kelley the Elder" to avoid confusion with John J. Kelley (1930–2011; "Kelley the Younger"), winner of the 1957 Boston Marathon; the two men were not related.

Biography

Born in West Medford, Massachusetts, as one of ten children, Kelley ran track and cross-country at Arlington High School in Massachusetts.  He did not finish his first Boston Marathon in 1928, but eventually competed in a record 61 Boston Marathons.

Regarded as a legend of the marathon, Kelley won the 1935 and 1945 runnings of the Boston Marathon.  He finished in second place at Boston a record seven times.  Between 1934 and 1950, he finished in the top five 15 times at Boston, consistently running in the 2:30s. Kelley also ran the Yonkers Marathon 29 times.

In 1936, Kelley overtook Ellison "Tarzan" Brown near Heartbreak Hill, giving him a consolatory pat on the shoulder as he passed. This gesture renewed the competitive drive in Brown, who rallied, pulled ahead of Kelley, and went on to win—thereby, it was said, breaking Kelley's heart.

A member of the U.S. Olympic Team at the 1936 Summer Olympics in Berlin, Kelley finished 18th in the marathon. He again competed for the U.S. in the 1948 Summer Olympics in London.

At age 70, Kelley was still running  a week and around 15 races a year. He ran his 50th Boston Marathon in 1981; the event was also his 108th career marathon. Kelley ran his last full marathon at Boston in 1992 at the age of 84, his 61st start and 58th finish there. For two more years, he ran the last .

In 1993, a commemorative statue of Kelley was erected near the City Hall of Newton, Massachusetts, on the Boston Marathon course, one hill and about  prior to the foot of Heartbreak Hill.

Kelley was named "Runner of the Century" by Runner's World magazine in 2000. He enjoyed painting and worked in natural landscapes, producing about 20 paintings a year. One commissioned work is The Boston Dream, a Primitive School painting showing the marathon course, with Hopkinton and Boston rising from the distance, as two winter runners—a woman and a man—train for their "Boston dream".

Kelley died in 2004 at age 97; he is buried in Quivet Neck Cemetery in East Dennis, Massachusetts.

Quotes

See also
 List of winners of the Boston Marathon
 Les Pawson

Notes

References

References
 Running Past profile
 Boston Globe obituary

External links
 
 Obituary at ESPN
 Photo story and obituary in the Boston Globe Retrieved 2008-03-19
 Postcards written and sent by Johnny Kelley from the 1936 Berlin Olympic Games

1907 births
2004 deaths
American male long-distance runners
Athletes (track and field) at the 1936 Summer Olympics
Athletes (track and field) at the 1948 Summer Olympics
Olympic track and field athletes of the United States
People from Arlington, Massachusetts
Boston Marathon male winners
American masters athletes
Arlington High School (Massachusetts) alumni
Sportspeople from Middlesex County, Massachusetts